Plymouth is a city in Wayne County, Michigan, United States. The population was 9,370 at the 2020 census. The city of Plymouth is surrounded by Plymouth Township, but the two are administered autonomously.

Geography

Culture
The City of Plymouth has a variety of shops and restaurants surrounding Kellogg Park, the de facto center of town. The Inn at St. John's, a hotel conference center and golf resort, is located in Plymouth. The city offers more than fifty recreation programs for all age groups, an NHL-size ice arena (used by the USA national teams for training) and twelve parks. It also organizes major community events such as the popular Fall Festival, Ice Sculpture Spectacular and the Art in the Park, and access to the Plymouth-Canton school district, with a unique complex composed of three high schools located on one  campus and is now one of the highest populated high school campuses in the country (nicknamed “the park”) with close to 6500 students and over 800 faculty members.

The Plymouth Ice Spectacular, the largest and oldest ice carving festival in North America, is held every year in Plymouth in late January. Founded in 1982 by then 25-year-old Scott Lorenz, the weekend-long event draws an average of 500,000 people to Plymouth each year and has helped establish ice carving as a world-class competitive event.

Since 2008, Plymouth has been home to the Green Street Fair, held over a weekend each May. Featuring green-themed exhibitors and activities, the event has become a yearly tradition. In 2011, the event was attended by about 90,000 visitors.

Plymouth's "Art in the Park" is Michigan's second largest art fair. Visitors have enjoyed Plymouth Art in the Park since its inaugural event in 1980. Plymouth Art in the Park, founded, directed and managed by mother and daughter team Dianne Quinn and Raychel Rork, celebrated its 33rd show in 2012. The event hosts over 450 artists and 300,000 attendees each year.

Another very popular community tradition/event is Plymouth's Fall Festival. This annual event is held the weekend after Labor Day. The Fall Festival is an event for all ages with numerous rides and other attractions.

Other events include Plymouth's "Music in the Air", held every Friday night June through September, beginning at approximately 7:00 pm, showcasing a number of bands performing a wide variety of music. The Historic Old Village hosts events such as "Bumpers Bikes and Bands", the "Old Village Restaurant Crawl", and the family-friendly "Haunted Halloween" on Liberty Street. The Old Village is located on Plymouth's north side and borders Hines Park.

History
Plymouth was first settled in 1825, incorporated as a village in 1867, and became a city in 1932.

Foundation
In 1825, Luther Lincoln was granted two land patents in what is now Plymouth by the federal government. Lincoln built his place of business, his saw mill, and abode, near the eastern boundary of his land, along the Rouge River. His actual abode and saw mill was always outside the city limits. Another early settler was William Starkweather. William and his wife Keziah brought their firstborn son Albert to the area and built the first home in Plymouth, at what is now the southwest corner of Main Street and Ann Arbor Trail. The first home was a lean-to, and was later replaced by a log cabin, which has since been destroyed.

Growth
In 1831, William Starkweather sold his land in downtown Plymouth and in 1831 purchased an  parcel of land in what was then called "North Village" (now called "The Historic Old Village"). In 1844, William died and the land in Old Village was then passed to William's son, George A Starkweather. George felt that the railroad coming to North Village would give it a commercial advantage over the Kellogg Park area. In the 1860s, he convinced the Detroit and Howell Railroad Company to build through the town. Starkweather was responsible for cutting Oak Street North through his farm in order to reach his new store and the train station. After his death in 1907, Oak Street was renamed Starkweather in his honor.

Notable streets in Plymouth are named after some Starkweather family members, including Blanche (after Blanche Starkweather, daughter of George Starkweather), Karmada (after the grandchildren of George Starkweather – Karl, Max and Davis), Davis – after Davis B Hillmer – youngest grandson of George Starkweather, Starkweather (formerly Oak Street), Amelia (after Lydia Amelia Heywood – Davis - Starkweather) – George Starkweather's wife, and Rose – after Rose Hillmer, eldest grand daughter of George Starkweather. Starkweather Elementary School was named after George Anson Starkweather of Plymouth, which was converted to an adult education center.

Daisy Manufacturing Company, now Daisy Outdoor Products, started in 1882 in Plymouth as the Plymouth Iron Windmill Company. In 1886 Plymouth inventor Clarence Hamilton introduced a new idea to the windmill company. It was a combination of metal and wire, vaguely resembling a gun that could fire a lead ball using compressed air. Lewis Cass Hough, then president of the firm, gave it a try and, after his first shot, enthusiastically exclaimed, "Boy, that's a daisy!" The name stuck, and the BB gun went into production as a premium item given to farmers when they purchased a windmill. The gun was such a huge success that Plymouth Iron Windmill soon began manufacturing the Daisy BB gun in place of windmills. On January 26, 1895, the company's board of directors officially voted to change the name to Daisy Manufacturing Company, Inc.

Recent history
Much to the dismay of Plymouth residents, Daisy moved its corporate offices and manufacturing facilities from Plymouth to Rogers, Arkansas in 1958.

In 2003 the former Daisy factory was converted to Daisy Square Condominiums despite being situated next to an active freight rail line. The front wall of the Daisy factory was left standing to be built into the apartment building.  The wall has since been demolished.

In 2009 Plymouth Township was named 28th Best Place to Live in the United States by CNN Money Magazine.

Demographics

2010 census
As of the census of 2010, there were 9,132 people, 4,314 households, and 2,218 families residing in the city. The racial makeup of the city was 94.2% White, 1.6% African American, 0.3% Native American, 2.2% Asian, 0.4% from other races, and 1.4% from two or more races. Hispanic or Latino of any race were 1.8% of the population.

There were 4,314 households, of which 25.7% had children under the age of 18 living with them, 40.6% were married couples living together, 7.9% had a female householder with no husband present, 2.9% had a male householder with no wife present, and 48.6% were non-families. 42.4% of all households were made up of individuals, and 13.2% had someone living alone who was 65 years of age or older. The average household size was 2.08 and the average family size was 2.93.

The median age in the city was 39.2 years. 21.5% of residents were under the age of 18; 5.7% were between the ages of 18 and 24; 31.8% were from 25 to 44; 27% were from 45 to 64; and 14% were 65 years of age or older. The gender makeup of the city was 48.0% male and 52.0% female.

2000 census
As of the census of 2000, there were 9,022 people, 4,322 households, and 2,277 families residing in the city. The racial makeup of the city was 96.42% White, 0.57% African American, 0.35% Native American, 1.05% Asian, 0.07% Pacific Islander, 0.30% from other races, and 1.24% from two or more races. Hispanic or Latino of any race were 1.31% of the population. 20.4% were of German, 13.2% Irish, 12.4% English, 10.7% Polish and 7.9% Italian ancestry.

There were 4,322 households, of which 22.2% had children under the age of 18 living with them, 42.5% were married couples living together, 7.5% had a female householder with no husband present, and 47.3% were non-families. 41.5% of all households were made up of individuals, and 13.3% had someone living alone who was 65 years of age or older. The average household size was 2.04 and the average family size was 2.81.

In the city, the population was spread out, with 18.7% under the age of 18, 5.8% from 18 to 24, 37.5% from 25 to 44, 21.7% from 45 to 64, and 16.2% who were 65 years of age or older. The median age was 38 years. For every 100 females, there were 88.7 males. For every 100 females age 18 and over, there were 85.4 males.

The median income for a household in the city was $51,535, and the median income for a family was $76,369. Males had a median income of $52,188 versus $37,113 for females. The per capita income for the city was $33,222. About 1.9% of families and 3.3% of the population were below the poverty line, including 3.8% of those under age 18 and 3.6% of those age 65 or over.

Government and infrastructure

In 1995, the City of Plymouth and Plymouth Township consolidated their fire departments with the township controlling fire services. The township receives $1 million from the city, making up 25% of the consolidated fire department's budget.

The Plymouth District Library offers books, video games, and movies through subscription databases.  The Library also has a section where you can buy some books.

Schools

The Plymouth-Canton Community School District consists of three high schools, five middle schools, and sixteen elementary schools. The district has the only educational park in Michigan, the Plymouth-Canton Educational Park (P-CEP).

Other schools:
 Spiritus Sanctus Academy Catholic School (private)
New Morning School (private)
Our Lady of Good Counsel Catholic School (private)
Ivywood Classical Academy (public/charter)
New School High (public/charter)

Notable people

 
 
 Edward Samuel Corwin, author and former president of the American Political Science Association
 Margaret Dunning, philanthropist
 Ron Egloff, NFL football player
 Tom Hulce, actor
 Aidan Hutchinson, defensive end for the Detroit Lions, former player for Michigan
 Jackie Johnson, television weather forecaster
 Russell Kirk, political theorist, influential of American conservatism
 Jeremy Porter, musician
 Alex Shelley, professional wrestler
 Rufus Thayer, Judge of the United States Court for China
 Paul Warren, musician

Notes

References and further reading
Hillmer, Mary K. Starkweather. My People: Some Ancestors of the Starkweather – Heywood – Hillmer Family From Earliest Known Beginnings to 1948.
Hudson, Samuel. The Story of Plymouth, Michigan: A Midwest Microcosm. Plymouth, Mich.: Plymouth Historical Society, 1976.
Kerstens, Elizabeth Kelley. Plymouth's First Century: Innovators and Industry. Chicago: Arcadia Publishing, 2002.
Kerstens, Elizabeth Kelley. Plymouth in Vintage Postcards. Chicago: Arcadia Publishing, 2003.
Starkweather, Carlton Lee. A brief genealogical history of Robert Starkweather of Roxbury and Ipswich. Auburn, N.Y.: Knapp, Peck and Thomson, 1904.

External links

 City of Plymouth official website
 The Historic Old Village
 Plymouth Historical Museum
 Plymouth Downtown Development Authority

Cities in Wayne County, Michigan
Populated places established in 1825
Metro Detroit
1825 establishments in Michigan Territory